Richard John Wilkins (born 28 May 1965) is an English former professional footballer who played as a midfielder.

Career
Born in Lambeth in London, Wilkins began his career at non-League club Haverhill Rovers in 1985. On 20 November 1986 he signed for Colchester United. After 150 appearances, he was signed by Cambridge United in July 1990 for £60,000. In 1994, he moved to Hereford United on a free transfer, before being re-signed by Colchester in 1996 for a fee of £30,000. He retired from professional football in 2000 before becoming manager of non-League club Bury Town. He led the club to two promotions, in 2005-06 from the Eastern Counties League, and in 2009-10 from the Southern Football League Division One Midlands. Wilkins stepped down from the role at the end of the 2013–14 season. In July 2014, Wilkins joined fellow Suffolk side Leiston as Steve Ball's assistant. He then took over as manager shortly after and led the side to the top half of the Isthmian League Premier Division in his first season. In his second season the side were challenging for promotion. He then left the club by mutual consent before joining Needham Market as the assistant manager. He became manager of Needham Market at the end of the 2016–17 season, remaining at the club until February 2020.

Honours

Club
Colchester United
 Football League Trophy Runner-up (1): 1996–97
 Football League Division Three Playoff Winner (1): 1997–98

Individual
 Colchester United Player of the Year (1): 1998

References

1965 births
Living people
Footballers from Lambeth
English footballers
Haverhill Rovers F.C. players
Colchester United F.C. players
Cambridge United F.C. players
Hereford United F.C. players
English Football League players
English football managers
Isthmian League managers
Bury Town F.C. managers
Leiston F.C. managers
Needham Market F.C. managers
Association football midfielders